Pope Boniface VI (806 – April 896) was the bishop of Rome and ruler of the Papal States in April 896. He was a native of Rome. His election came about as a result of riots soon after the death of Pope Formosus. Prior to his reign, he had twice incurred a sentence of deprivation of orders as a subdeacon and as a priest. After a pontificate of fifteen days, he is said by some to have died of the gout, by others to have been forcibly ejected to make way for Stephen VI, the candidate of the Spoletan party.

At a synod in Rome held by John IX in 898, his election was pronounced null and void.

See also

List of shortest-reigning popes

References

Boniface 06
Boniface 06
Boniface 06
Boniface 06
9th-century popes
805 births
Burials at St. Peter's Basilica